Prawin Pudi is an Indian film editor who has worked on Telugu language films.

Career
Prawin Pudi joined the Telugu film industry as an assistant to editor Kotagiri Venkateswara Rao in 2000, before also apprenticing under Sreekar Prasad and Marthand K. Venkatesh. He worked on Telugu films in the early 2000s as an assistant editor, before moving on to work as a free lancer for corporate films, documentaries and television advertisements, before shifting to Pawan Kalyan Creative Works as an associate editor. After making his debut as an independent editor with Aakasa Ramanna (2010), his first breakthrough came after working with Trivikram Srinivas in the action comedy Julayi (2012). Since then, Prawin has regularly collaborated with the film maker in Attarintiki Daredi (2013) and S/O Satyamurthy (2015). He has also worked closely with Vikram Kumar, working with him in the successful Manam (2014) and the Tamil film, 24 (2016).

He was also associated in the making of I Am That Change, a short film produced by Allu Arjun to mark the 68th Independence Day of India.

Filmography

As editor

References

External links
 

Living people
Telugu film editors
Tamil film editors
1984 births